Willis Bernardo García García (born July 29, 1970) is a retired male judoka from Venezuela.

García claimed the bronze medal in the Men's Flyweight (– 56 kg) division at the 1991 Pan American Games in Havana, Cuba, alongside Brazil's Sumio Tsujimoto. He represented his native country at the 1992 Summer Olympics in Barcelona, Spain, finishing in seventh place (tied).

References
sports-reference

1970 births
Living people
Venezuelan male judoka
Judoka at the 1992 Summer Olympics
Olympic judoka of Venezuela
Pan American Games bronze medalists for Venezuela
Pan American Games medalists in judo
Judoka at the 1991 Pan American Games
Medalists at the 1991 Pan American Games
20th-century Venezuelan people
21st-century Venezuelan people